Trichosanthes kirilowii is a flowering plant in the family Cucurbitaceae found particularly in Henan, Shandong, Hebei, Shanxi, and Shaanxi. It is one of the 50 fundamental herbs used in traditional Chinese medicine, where it shares the name guālóu with the related T. rosthornii. It is known as "Chinese cucumber" and "Chinese snake gourd" in English.

Traditional uses

The tuber of this plant is known in Mandarin as tiān huā fěn. In traditional Chinese medicine it is said to drain heat and generate fluids, clear and drain lung heat, transform phlegm, and moisten lung dryness, and resolve toxicity and expel pus. The fruit of the plant, also referred to in Mandarin as guālóu, is said to clear heat and transform phlegm-heat, unbind the chest, reduces abscesses and dissipate nodules. Both forms should be considered safe only for use with professional guidance by someone trained in their use, though this may be an unnecessary extrapolation from the toxicity of purified trichosanthin.
Extracts from the plant have been shown to damage the protein coat on the RNA of the AIDS virus in vitro.

Chemical components
The plant is a source of the ricin-like protein trichosanthin.

Notes

References

External links

kirilowii
Medicinal plants
Plants used in traditional Chinese medicine